Ebberston railway station was situated on the North Eastern Railway's Pickering to Seamer branch line.  It served the villages of Allerston, Ebberston and Wilton. The station opened to passenger traffic on 1 May 1882, and closed on 3 June 1950.
The station has been restored completely, with track laid along the platform. Three camping coaches are available for hire as holiday accommodation.

References

External links
 Ebberston station on navigable 1947 O. S. map
 Station website - details of accommodation

Disused railway stations in North Yorkshire
Railway stations in Great Britain opened in 1882
Railway stations in Great Britain closed in 1950
Former North Eastern Railway (UK) stations